Griselda Yeung (born 10 November 1977) is a Hong Kong actress contracted to TVB and older sister of actress Tavia Yeung. She changed her English name to Lenna.

While her sister graduated from TVB Acting Class, she took part in Miss Hong Kong 2001 and received the Creative Cooperation Award with her group. She is best known for her role as Concubine Suen in Can't Buy Me Love and as the lawyer Fung Yin-ha in Come Home Love.

Filmography

References

1977 births
Actresses from Guangdong
Hong Kong film actresses
Hong Kong television actresses
Living people
People from Zhanjiang
TVB veteran actors
21st-century Hong Kong actresses
Chinese film actresses
Chinese television actresses
21st-century Chinese actresses